Tom Søndergaard (2 January 1944 – 16 June 1997) was a Danish footballer.

Club career
During his club career he played for B93, Rapid Vienna, Ajax, Metz and HIK.

International career
He earned 19 caps for the Denmark national football team, and was in the finals squad for the 1964 European Nations' Cup.

References

External links
 Profile
 Profile at DBU
Profile - FC Metz

1944 births
1997 deaths
Danish men's footballers
Denmark international footballers
Boldklubben af 1893 players
SK Rapid Wien players
AFC Ajax players
FC Metz players
Hellerup IK players
Eredivisie players
Ligue 1 players
Austrian Football Bundesliga players
1964 European Nations' Cup players
Danish expatriate men's footballers
Expatriate footballers in Austria
Danish expatriate sportspeople in Austria
Expatriate footballers in the Netherlands
Danish expatriate sportspeople in the Netherlands
Expatriate footballers in France
Danish expatriate sportspeople in France
Association football forwards